Socialist Unity Party may refer to:

Canadian National Socialist Unity Party
Republican Socialist Unity Party, Bolivia
Socialist Unity Party (Finland)
Socialist Unity Party (Turkey)
Socialist Unity Party of Germany
Socialist Unity Party of New Zealand
Socialist Unity Party of West Berlin, Germany

See also
Socialist Unity (disambiguation)
Socialist Party (disambiguation)